"Metel" (from Russian: "Метель" - "Blizzard") was a Guards Uragan-class guard ship, of the Soviet Navy. Commissioned in 1934, it was attached to the Pacific Fleet. During World War II the ship fought mainly against the Imperial Japanese Navy in the Far East. On August 26, 1945 it acquired guards status and the ship's commander, Captain-Lieutenant L. N. Balyakin, was awarded the Hero of the Soviet Union on September 14.

External links 
More information (Czech language; archived)

Ships of the Soviet Navy
Metel
1934 ships